Makhoshepolyana is a rural locality (a selo) in Tulskoye Rural Settlement of Maykopsky District, Russia. The population was 6 as of 2018. There is 1 street.

Geography 
Makhoshepolyana is located 18 km southeast of Tulsky (the district's administrative centre) by road. Tulsky is the nearest rural locality.

Ethnicity 
The village is inhabited by Armenians and Mari.

References 

Rural localities in Maykopsky District